This is a list of all rail trails and major long-distance hiking and cycling routes in Canada.

National 

 Trans Canada Trail

Alberta 
 Iron Horse Trail, Alberta

British Columbia 
 Alexander MacKenzie Heritage Trail
 Centennial Trail
 Columbia & Western Rail Trail
 Great Divide Trail
 Cowichan Valley Trail
 Galloping Goose Regional Trail
 Interurban Rail Trail
 Kettle Valley Rail Trail
 Kludahk Trail
 Lochside Regional Trail
 Okanagan Rail Trail
 Slocan Valley Rail-Trail
 Vancouver Island Spine Trail
 West Coast Trail

New Brunswick 
 Dobson Trail
 Riverfront Trail
 Sentier NB Trail

Newfoundland 
 Newfoundland T'Railway

Nova Scotia 
 Atlantic View Trail
 Back Harbour Trail
 Barrington Bay Trail
 Beechville-Lakeside-Timberlea Trail
 Blueberry Run Trail
 Bridgewater Centennial Trail
 Chain of Lakes Multipurpose Trail
 Cobequid Trail
 Crowbar Lake Hiking Trails
 Gaetz Brook Greenway
 Jitney Trail
 Jordan Falls Community Trail
 Judique Flyer Recreational Nature Trail
 Kentville Rail Trail
 Lunenburg Front Harbour Walk
 Musquodoboit Trailway
 Old Guysborough Line
 Oyster Pond Trail
 Salt Marsh Trail
 Shearwater Flyer Trail
 Shelburne Rail Trail
 Ship Railway
 St. Margarets Bay Trail
 Trestle Trail

Ontario 
 Hamilton-Brantford-Cambridge Trails
 New York Central Recreational Trail, Embrun-Russell
 Riverfront Trail, Windsor, uses some former CN rail lines' right-of-way along the Detroit River
 West Toronto Railpath, Toronto
Beltline Trail, Toronto

Prince Edward Island 
 Confederation Trail

Quebec 
 Route Verte trails

Route 1:
 La Cantonière
 Cycloparc PPJ
 L'Estriade
 Montérégiade
 Parc linéaire de la MRC de Lotbinière
 Parc linéaire des Bois-Francs
 Parc linéaire Le Grand Tronc
 Sentier Massawippi
 La Vagabonde

Route 2:
 Ligne du Mocassin
 Parc linéaire des Basse-Laurentides
 Parc Linéaire Le P'tit Train du Nord
 Parc linéaire Rouyn-Noranda–Taschereau

Route 4:
 La Campagnarde

Route 6:
 Corridor des Cheminots
 Piste Jarcques-Cartier/Portneuf

Route 8:
 Parc linéaire interprovincial Petit-Témis

Regional trails:
 Corridor Aérobique
 Corridors Verts d'Asbestos
 Parc linéaire de la Vallée de la Gatineau
 Route des Champs
 Sentier Nature Tomifobia

References

External links

 Terrance J. Norman, Canadian Trails Study: A Comprehensive Analysis of Managed Trails and Trail Uses, National Trails coalition, December 2010
 Hike Ontario
 Canada Trails - guide to bicycling, hiking, mountain biking, cross-country skiing and multi-use trails in Canada, including the Trans Canada Trail

.
.
.
Cycling in Canada
Trails
Canada
Trails